Nicole Behar (born November 15, 1997) is an American stock car racing driver. She debuted in NASCAR K&N Pro Series West competition in 2014, driving the No. 33 for her family racing team.

Racing career

A fifth generation racer, Behar began go-kart racing after her sixth birthday, transitioning to full bodied cars at fourteen.

Behar entered the K&N Pro Series West with her family team toward the end of the 2014 season, finishing 6th (of 17 cars) in her debut race. The following season, she commanded significant attention after her second-place finish at the King Taco Catering/NAPA Auto Parts 150, earning an invitation into the NASCAR Next program for promising young drivers. Running consistently in the top half of the field, Behar finished the year with nine top-10s in thirteen races, good enough for 10th place in the final points standings. For the 2016 season, Behar signed a development deal with the better resourced David Gilliland Racing to run the CARS Super Late Model Tour,  but parted ways with the outfit amid unclear circumstances after attempting and starting only one of the first three races. Undeterred, Behar started and finished third in her ARCA Racing Series debut that June at Madison International Speedway, driving a Toyota for Venturini Motorsports. Subsequently, Behar returned to the K&N Pro Series West for four starts, adding four top-10 finishes for a career total of fifteen, a record among female K&N  Pro Series West drivers. At Idaho's Meridian Speedway, she finished third to Julia Landauer's second, the first time two women had run top-5 in the same NASCAR touring series race since 1988.

Personal life
Behar has put her college aspirations on hiatus, moving to Mooresville, North Carolina in January 2016 to be closer to the hub of stock car racing.

Motorsports career results

NASCAR
(key) (Bold – Pole position awarded by qualifying time. Italics – Pole position earned by points standings or practice time. * – Most laps led.)

K&N Pro Series West

ARCA Racing Series

References

External links
 
 

1997 births
Living people
Racing drivers from Washington (state)
NASCAR drivers
American female racing drivers
ARCA Menards Series drivers
21st-century American women